Levan Khomeriki (born 20 January 1974) is a retired Georgian football player.

External links
 

1974 births
Living people
Sportspeople from Batumi
Footballers from Georgia (country)
Association football forwards
Erovnuli Liga players
FC Dinamo Tbilisi players
FC Dinamo Batumi players
K.R.C. Mechelen players
Hapoel Haifa F.C. players
FC Aarau players
FC Wohlen players
Expatriate footballers from Georgia (country)
Expatriate footballers in Belgium
Expatriate sportspeople from Georgia (country) in Belgium
Expatriate footballers in Israel
Expatriate sportspeople from Georgia (country) in Israel
Expatriate footballers in Switzerland
Expatriate sportspeople from Georgia (country) in Switzerland
Football managers from Georgia (country)
FC Dinamo Batumi managers